This is a list of the Australian moth species of the family Lymantriidae. It also acts as an index to the species articles and forms part of the full List of moths of Australia.

Acyphas amphideta (Turner, 1902)
Acyphas chionitis (Turner, 1902)
Acyphas fulviceps (Walker, 1855)
Acyphas leptotypa (Turner, 1904)
Acyphas pelodes (Lower, 1893)
Acyphas semiochrea (Herrich-Schäffer, 1855)
Arctornis submarginata (Walker, 1855)
Calliteara farenoides (T.P. Lucas, 1892)
Calliteara pura (T.P. Lucas, 1892)
Dura niveus (Bethune-Baker, 1904)
Dura ochrias (Turner, 1906)
Euproctis acatharta (Turner, 1906)
Euproctis actor Turner, 1920
Euproctis aganopa Turner, 1921
Euproctis aliena (Butler, 1886)
Euproctis arrogans (T.P. Lucas, 1900)
Euproctis baliolalis (Swinhoe, 1892)
Euproctis crocea (Walker, 1865)
Euproctis edwardsii (Newman, 1856)
Euproctis emprepes Turner, 1931
Euproctis epaxia Turner, 1906
Euproctis epidela Turner, 1906
Euproctis euthysana (Turner, 1902)
Euproctis fimbriata (T.P. Lucas, 1891)
Euproctis galactopis (Turner, 1902)
Euproctis habrostola Turner, 1902
Euproctis holoxutha Turner, 1902
Euproctis hymnolis Turner, 1921
Euproctis idonea Swinhoe, 1903
Euproctis leonina (Turner, 1903)
Euproctis limbalis (Herrich-Schäffer, 1855)
Euproctis lucifuga (T.P. Lucas, 1892)
Euproctis lutea (Fabricius, 1775)
Euproctis marginalis (Walker, 1855)
Euproctis melanorrhanta (Turner, 1931)
Euproctis melanosoma (Butler, 1882)
Euproctis niphobola Turner, 1902
Euproctis ochroneura Turner, 1931
Euproctis panabra (Turner, 1902)
Euproctis paradoxa (Butler, 1886)
Euproctis pyraustis (Meyrick, 1891)
Euproctis semifusca (Walker, 1869)
Euproctis stenomorpha Turner, 1921
Euproctis subnobilis (Snellen, 1881)
Euproctis trispila (Turner, 1921)
Euproctis urbis Strand, 1925
Euproctis xuthoptera (Turner, 1921)
Euproctis xuthosterna (Turner, 1924)
Euzora collucens (T.P. Lucas, 1890)
Habrophylla euryzona (Lower, 1902)
Habrophylla pycnadelpha (Lower, 1903)
Habrophylla retinopepla (Lower, 1905)
Icta fulviceps Walker, 1855
Icta tanaopis Turner, 1921
Iropoca rotundata (Walker, 1855)
Laelia furva Turner, 1931
Laelia obsoleta (Fabricius, 1775)
Leptocneria binotata Butler, 1886
Leptocneria reducta (Walker, 1855)
Lymantria antennata Walker, 1855
Lymantria lunata (Stoll, 1782)
Lymantria nephrographa Turner, 1915
Lymantria pelospila Turner, 1915
Olene cookiensis (Strand, 1915)
Olene dryina (Lower, 1900)
Olene mendosa Hübner, 1823
Oligeria hemicalla (Lower, 1905)
Orgyia australis Walker, 1855
Orgyia papuana Riotte, 1976
Psalis pennatula (Fabricius, 1793)
Teia anartoides Walker, 1855
Teia athlophora (Turner, 1921)

External links 
Lymantriidae at Australian Faunal Directory
Lymantriidae at Australian Insects

Australia
Lymantriinae